Bang Ye-dam (Korean: 방예담; born May 7, 2002) is a South Korean singer and former member of the boy band, Treasure  under YG Entertainment. He is best known for competing in the second installment of K-pop Star (2012–2013) where he finished as runner-up. In June 2013, Bang was scouted by YG Entertainment and joined as a trainee. Following a seven-year training period, he released the digital single titled "Wayo" (왜요) on June 5, 2020. Thereafter, he debuted with Treasure on August 7. He left Treasure on November 8, 2022 after terminating his contract.

Life and career

2002–2011: Early life 

Bang Ye-dam was born on May 7, 2002 in Mapo District, Seoul, South Korea. Coming from a musically-oriented family, his father,  is well known for creating over forty songs for commercials and animations including the Korean-dub for Japanese anime opening songs Pokémon, Dragon Ball and more. His mother, Jung Mi-young is well known for singing soundtracks in Korean drama Friends and film After the Show Ends (연극이 끝난 뒤). His uncle  is well known as a composer and director in the commercial film industry. Within his family, he is an only child. Five-year-old Bang (Korean age) participated in the opening songs for EBS' television series Bboong bboong-E (방귀대장 뿡뿡이) and the Korean-dub version of the Japanese anime Onegai! Samia-don (모래요정 바람돌이). On March 5, 2007 he made his first television appearance on EBS' documentary 15 Second Fever, Hold the World with his parents.

2012–present: Career beginnings, debut and departure from Treasure 

In August 2012, Bang auditioned for SBS' K-pop Star Season 2. During the first round, BoA complimented his vocals by comparing to a young Michael Jackson. Park Jin-young praised his rhythm while Yang Hyun-suk was intrigued, commending his voice could reach the soul of the audience. He placed runner-up behind sibling duo Akdong Musician (AKMU). In June 2013, Yang Hyun-suk confirmed Bang had joined his label, thus, both first and second-place winners were now signed under YG Entertainment. That same year, he appeared on the finale of WIN: Who is Next with Lee Hi and Akdong Musician and sang Officially Missing You on October 27. Interactions with Kpop Star alumni, Lee Seung-hoon, resulted in appearances in unreleased clips from the show with Winner, formerly Team A. In January 2014, he also made a cameo appearance on Winner TV.

Bang appeared on television for the first time in four years with Stray Kids (2017) alongside other fellow trainees under YG Entertainment as its representatives. His name rose to the top of South Korean search portal site Naver while his performance video for "There's Nothing Holdin' Me Back" by Shawn Mendes peaked at number 1 on the Naver TV top 100 popular videos chart. On YouTube the video surpassed 3 million views in 24 hours and accumulated 54 million views as of March 2023. On October 5, 2018 he made a cameo appearance on Netflix television series YG Future Strategy Office (2018) as himself. 

In November 2018, Bang participated in reality survival program YG Treasure Box (2018), where 29 trainees competed to secure a spot in the new boy group. He participated as a contestant under "Team A". During the finals, Bang joined the final line-up by overall placing first among the vocal team. Marking the show's end, it was revealed the boy group had been named Treasure. On May 21, 2020 YG Entertainment announced ahead of Treasure's official debut, Bang would release a digital single, later revealed to be entitled "Wayo", on June 5. Notably, label-mates Kang Seung-yoon of Winner and Lee Chan-hyuk of AKMU participated in production. The song was accompanied with a music video dedicated to fans who supported him since his appearance on K-pop Star Season 2. His single did not carry out any broadcasting promotions due to his upcoming preparations for debut with Treasure. Upon release, the digital single peaked at number 10 on the Billboard World Digital Songs chart and entered the top 100 at number 98 on the Billboard Korea K-Pop 100 chart. Bang trained at YG Entertainment for seven years before officially debuting as a member of Treasure on August 7. They released the first installment to their The First Step series with the single album The First Step: Chapter One which included the lead single entitled "Boy". Five months into their career, The First Step series sold over one million copies. In result, the group earned the title "Million Seller".

On November 8, 2022, YG Entertainment announced that Bang's exclusive contract with their company had been terminated and that him and fellow member Mashiho left the group. YG's statement stated that Bang left to pursue a career in producing.

Personal life 

While attending Kwang-sung middle school, it was revealed that academically Bang placed first among the entire school. Bang attended School of Performing Arts Seoul (SOPA), majoring in Practical Music located in Guro-gu, Seoul. In November 2018, he revealed he ranked the highest within the entire school during mock exams for the subjects Social studies and Science, and was named a "model student" in both school and as a trainee. Bang graduated from SOPA on February 5, 2021.

Artistry

Influences 

Through EBS' Story, Bang revealed his greatest influences towards music are Michael Jackson and his parents. He has also cited G-Dragon of Big Bang as a role model.

Discography

As a lead artist

Other charted songs

Songwriting credits 
All song credits are adapted from the Korea Music Copyright Association's database, unless otherwise noted.

Work as Treasure

Other artists

Videography

Music video

Filmography

Television series

Television shows

Web series

Awards and nominations

Notes

References 

2002 births
Living people
People from Seoul
Singers from Seoul
K-pop singers
Treasure (band) members
South Korean child singers
South Korean male idols
South Korean pop singers
South Korean rhythm and blues singers
South Korean hip hop singers
South Korean dance musicians
School of Performing Arts Seoul alumni
YG Entertainment artists
K-pop Star participants
21st-century South Korean male  singers
Japanese-language singers of South Korea